Dometius (? – 284) was bishop of Byzantium about the period 272–284.

He was a brother of the Roman Emperor Probus. He converted to Christianity, and entered the clergy when he was baptised by the bishop of Byzantium Titus, whom he succeeded.

He had two sons, Probus and Metrophanes, who also became bishops of the same city.

Sources
Οικουμενικό Πατριαρχείο

3rd-century Romans
3rd-century Byzantine bishops
Bishops of Byzantium